is a traditional Japanese soup consisting of a dashi stock into which softened miso paste is mixed. In addition, there are many optional ingredients (various vegetables, tofu, abura-age, etc.) that may be added depending on regional and seasonal recipes, and personal preference. In Japanese food culture, miso soup is a representative of soup dishes served with rice. Miso soup is also called .

Along with suimono (clear soup seasoned with a small amount of soy sauce and salt in a dashi stock), miso soup is considered to be one of the two basic soup types of Japanese cuisine.

Miso paste 

The type of miso paste chosen for the soup defines a great deal of its character and flavor.

The amount of time taken also affects its flavor: a miso paste that has been fermented for a shorter period of time, such as a white miso, provides a lighter, sweeter flavor, while one which has been fermented for a longer period, such as a red miso, gives the miso soup a stronger, deeper one.

More than 80% of Japan's annual production of miso is used in miso soup, and 75% of all Japanese people consume miso soup at least once a day.

Stock 

The most common dashi soup stocks for miso soup are made of niboshi (dried baby sardines), kombu (dried kelp), katsuobushi (thin shavings of dried and smoked bonito (similar to skipjack tuna)), or hoshi-shiitake (dried shiitake). The kombu can also be used in combination with katsuobushi or hoshi-shiitake. The kelp and/or shiitake dashi serve as a vegetarian soup stock.

When the ingredients involve shellfish such as Asari clam (Venerupis philippinarum), Shijimi (Corbicula japonica), or Hamaguri (Meretrix lusoria) they will impart flavorings that serve the role of dashi and thus it is not necessary to prepare any stock in advance.

Outside Japan, American or European style miso soup is sometimes made by dissolving miso in a Western vegetable stock. The stock might include ingredients such as negi, carrot, potato and daikon radish. In some versions of the dish, chicken stock, Western-style fish stock, and other non-dashi bases can even be used, but there is some debate over whether or not miso soups made using these non-traditional bases count as true miso soup.

Other ingredients 

According to Japanese custom, ingredients are chosen to reflect the seasons and to provide contrasts of color, texture, and flavor. Thus negi and tofu, a strongly flavored ingredient mixed with a mildly flavored ingredient, are often combined. Ingredients that float, such as wakame seaweed, and ingredients that sink, such as potatoes, are also combined. Ingredients may include mushrooms (nameko or shiitake), potato, taro, seaweed, green laver, onion, nira, common bean, mitsuba, shrimp, fish, clams, and sliced daikon. Nearly any Japanese ingredient is added to some type of miso soup. However, typical miso soup recipes contain a small number of additional ingredients beyond dashi stock and miso.

If pork is added to miso soup, it is called tonjiru, meaning "pork soup". Tonjiru is a soup served for dinner and lunch and is not usually eaten as breakfast soup.

Hearty and robust cold weather variations may include daikon, deep-fried tofu called abura-age, potatoes, onions and dark miso varieties. Lighter variations are better suited for spring or summer months and made with ingredients like cabbage, seri, myoga, eggplant.

Preparation and serving 
Miso soup can be prepared in several ways, depending on the chef and the style of soup. Japanese recipes usually call for most vegetables to be cooked in the simmering dashi, particularly mushrooms, daikon, carrots, potatoes, tofu, and fish. The miso is suspended separately in some dashi stock removed from the simmering mix, to keep the miso paste from cooking, which alters the flavour, kills beneficial bacteria, and reduces the health benefits of biologically active miso paste. When the vegetables are cooked, the stock is removed from heat, the miso suspension is added and mixed into the soup, any uncooked ingredients are added, and the dish is served.

In Japan, miso soup and white rice make up the central dishes of the traditional Japanese breakfast. The soup has been a favorite of commoners and royalty alike for many centuries, but there are also many other dishes involving breakfast. They are all quite small, some include egg, fish, and nattō which is a fermented soybean. The soup is usually served in lacquer bowls with lids and drunk directly from the bowl, though the solid ingredients are eaten with chopsticks. The bowl sometimes has a lid to keep heat and aroma in as well as to improve the presentation.

Instant miso soup 
Instant miso soup is available in single-serving packets. It is usually sold in dehydrated powder and paste forms, though it sometimes also sold freeze dried. It generally contains dried toppings such as wakame and tofu with soybeans that reconstitute rapidly on the addition of hot water. These are popular in the Japanese workplace, where miso soup can be made with lunch as easily as green tea and using the same water. Instant miso soup is available in many grocery stores outside Japan. It has a shelf life of 3 to 12 months.

Wappani
 is a miso-soup-based dish unique to Awashima island off the coast of Niigata, Japan. A cedar flask is filled with miso soup, fish and vegetables and it is heated by dropping in hot rocks, which quickly bring it to a simmer. Hot rocks retain their heat for hours after being taken from the fire, so a hot meal can be prepared without the use of fire.

Health benefits 

In 2003, researchers at Japan's National Cancer Centre suggested that eating three or more bowls of miso soup every day could lower women's breast cancer risk.

Studies in 2020 have shown that habitual consumption of miso soup has the effect of lowering blood pressure and heart rate, or it has the effect of causing proliferation of good bacteria in the intestines and helping prevent constipation.

See also 

 List of Japanese soups and stews
 List of soups

References

Works cited

Further reading 
 The Miso Book: The Art of Cooking with Miso, by John Belleme & Jan Belleme, Square One Publishers

External links 

Japanese soups and stews
Vegetarian dishes of Japan
Soy-based foods